Guillaume Ignace Gibsone (8 October 1826 - 9 June 1897) was an English concert pianist and composer, born in London of Scottish and French parentage. Many of his compositions for solo piano and voice with piano accompaniment were very popular in the salons of Victorian England, but Gibsone has fallen from favour since then.

Selected works
Concert Paraphrase on "The Carnival of Venice"
Valse Mignonne
Sigh of the Night Winds
The Night Dancers
Funeral March
Lydia (Nocturne)
Les Amants (Song without words)
Corydon : 2 Pastorals
Deux Valses Impromptus
My Lady Sleeps (Song - Words by Longfellow)

English composers
1826 births
1897 deaths
19th-century British composers
19th-century English musicians